Romain Arneodo and Tristan-Samuel Weissborn were the defending champions but only Arneodo chose to defend his title, partnering Andrei Vasilevski. Arneodo lost in the first round to Elliot Benchetrit and Eliakim Coulibaly.

Albano Olivetti and David Vega Hernández won the title after Karol Drzewiecki and Kacper Żuk withdrew from the final.

Seeds

Draw

References

External links
 Main draw

Teréga Open Pau-Pyrénees - Doubles